The Chief of Staff of the Presidential Executive Office of the Russian Federation is the head of the Presidential Executive Office. The position was created by Boris Yeltsin's decree in 1991. The Chief of Staff is responsible for general management of presidential activity.

The incumbent Chief of Staff is Anton Vaino, who assumed the position in August 2016.

Responsibilities
In accordance with the Regulations on Administration approved by Presidential Decree on April 6, 2004 (No. 490):
 Represents management in the federal bodies of state power, bodies of state power of subjects and local authorities, as well as in Russian, international and foreign organizations; 
 Provides overall management of the heads of departments of administration and heads of other independent units of administration; 
 Allocate responsibilities to Deputy Chief of Staff; 
 Coordinates the activities of Presidential helpers and advisors and distributes questions relating to their jurisdiction; 
 Coordinates the activities of Presidential plenipotentiaries in federal districts; 
 On behalf of the President, makes proposals for the preparation of draft federal laws, decrees and orders, as well as the adoption of decisions and orders of the Government ; 
 Acts as the President for approval of draft Regulations on Administration and other independent division of administration; 
 Presents candidates for appointments and submits proposals to the President on the dismissal of officials 
 Comments on structure and strength of the Russian President, and other independent units of administration, operational management assigned to them and (or) that they lead; 
 Comments on proposals of the Secretary of the Russian Federation Security Council and the structure and staffing of the unit of the Security Council ; 
 Comments on presentation of presidential representatives in federal districts of the structure and personnel of their vehicles; 
 Approve the list of information to be classified; 
 Appoint and dismiss the head of the administration of its secretariat and his deputies, deputy chief and other employees of the independent divisions and the Deputy Plenipotentiary Representative of the President in the Federal District; 
 Define the powers of the Vice Chief of Staff on the appointment and dismissal of other officials, their promotion and application to them of disciplinary measures; 
 Issue orders on administration activities within its competence; 
 Provide certification of personnel administration, confer qualification level administration employees, except those employees who are assigned to the qualification level by President ; 
 Organize the execution of Presidential orders; 
 Request and receive necessary information from federal bodies of state power, bodies of state power of subjects, local authorities, as well as from organizations; 
 Organize training and exercise performance for the budget request for support of the President, content administration, maintenance and support of Presidential plenipotentiaries in federal districts and the content of their deputies, as well as the content of the Ombudsman at the European Court of Human Rights; 
 Disposes of budgetary funds in accordance with budget administration; 
 On behalf of the President makes a separate estimate of the administration changes that should not result in exceeding the expenditure of funds allocated from the federal budget for the relevant year; 
 Designate one of the Vice Chiefs of Staff to dispose of budget funds in accordance with budget administration.

Office holders

References

Political chiefs of staff
Presidential Administration of Russia